Saint Kitts and Nevis competed at the 2011 World Championships in Athletics from August 27 to September 4 in Daegu, South Korea.

Team selection

A team of 5 athletes was
announced to represent the country
in the event.  The team is led by former 100m sprint world champion Kim Collins.

The following athletes appeared on the preliminary Entry List, but not on the Official Start List of the specific event, resulting in a total number of 4 competitors:

Medalists
The following competitors from Saint Kitts and Nevis won medals at the Championships

All participating athletes won at least one medal.

Results

Men

References

External links
Official local organising committee website
Official IAAF competition website

Nations at the 2011 World Championships in Athletics
World Championships in Athletics
Saint Kitts and Nevis at the World Championships in Athletics